Joseph-Marie Le Gouaze (born 1883 in Saint-Thuriau) was a French clergyman and Archbishop of the Roman Catholic Archdiocese of Port-au-Prince. He was ordained in 1907. He was appointed bishop in 1930. He died in 1964.

References 

1883 births
1964 deaths
French Roman Catholic bishops
People from Morbihan
Roman Catholic archbishops of Port-au-Prince